Francisco Cascante (28 June 1928 – 1 August 1999) was a Cuban gymnast. He competed in seven events at the 1952 Summer Olympics.

References

1928 births
1999 deaths
Cuban male artistic gymnasts
Olympic gymnasts of Cuba
Gymnasts at the 1952 Summer Olympics
Place of birth missing
Pan American Games medalists in gymnastics
Pan American Games gold medalists for Cuba
Pan American Games silver medalists for Cuba
Pan American Games bronze medalists for Cuba
Gymnasts at the 1951 Pan American Games
Gymnasts at the 1955 Pan American Games
Medalists at the 1951 Pan American Games
Medalists at the 1955 Pan American Games
20th-century Cuban people